Kim Sung-ok (born 21 July 1970) is a South Korean rower. She competed in the women's coxless pair event at the 1992 Summer Olympics.

References

1970 births
Living people
South Korean female rowers
Olympic rowers of South Korea
Rowers at the 1992 Summer Olympics
Place of birth missing (living people)
Asian Games medalists in rowing
Rowers at the 1990 Asian Games
Asian Games silver medalists for South Korea
Asian Games bronze medalists for South Korea
Medalists at the 1990 Asian Games